Bake Apple Bight is a former hamlet in the Canadian province of Newfoundland and Labrador.

It was located on the Labrador coast, the nearest port of call was Smokey Tickle.

See also 
List of ghost towns in Newfoundland and Labrador

Ghost towns in Newfoundland and Labrador